The eighth series of Dancing on Ice aired from on 6 January to 10 March 2013 on ITV. Phillip Schofield and Christine Bleakley returned as hosts, and Jayne Torvill and Christopher Dean serving as mentors to the celebrities. The series was judged by The Ice Panel, consisting of Robin Cousins, Karen Barber, Ashley Roberts and Jason Gardiner. Gardiner returned to replace Louie Spence after departing at the end of series 6 in 2011 and Ashley Roberts joined The Ice Panel as Katarina Witt's replacement, while Barber rejoined The Ice Panel after serving as head coach in series 6 and 7. It was revealed that at the end of the show of 13 January that the duel would return, this saw two couples go head-to-head on the ice at the same time performing different routines to the same song, the judges then decided which one will be immune from the public vote.

Couples
The line-up was officially announced on 18 December 2012.

Scoring chart

 indicates the couple were eliminated that week
 indicates the couple were in the skate-off but not eliminated
 indicates the couple withdrew from the competition
 indicates the winning couple
 indicates the runner-up couple
 indicates the third-place couple
 indicate the highest score for that week
 indicate the lowest score for that week
"—" indicates the couple(s) that did not skate that week

Average score chart 
This table only counts for dances scored on a traditional 40-point scale (the duel skate and the doubled scores for the Team challenge are not included).

Live show details

Results summary
Colour key

Week 1 (6 January)
 Group performance: "Spectrum (Say My Name)"—Florence and the Machine
Unless indicated judges scores from left to right: Robin Cousins, Karen Barber, Ashley Roberts & Jason Gardiner.

Save Me skates
 Keith & Olga: "O Fortuna"—Carl Orff
 Pamela & Matt: "Sacrifice"—Sinead O'Connor

 Judges' votes to save
 Barber: Keith & Olga
 Roberts: Keith & Olga
 Gardiner: Keith & Olga
 Cousins: Keith & Olga

Week 2 (13 January)
 Group performance: "All About Tonight"—Pixie Lott

 Save Me skates
 Lauren & Michael: "Rescue Me"—Fontella Bass
 Anthea & Andy: "Lovin' You"—Minnie Riperton

 Judges' votes to save
 Barber: Anthea & Andy
 Roberts: Anthea & Andy
 Gardiner: Anthea & Andy
 Cousins: Anthea & Andy

Week 3 (20 January)
Theme: The duel
 Group performance: "Standing in the Way of Control"—The Gossip
 Duel pairs:
Matt & Brianne vs. Gareth & Robin
Beth & Daniel vs. Oona & Mark
Samia & Sylvain vs. Luke & Jenna
Anthea & Andrew vs. Shayne & Maria
Keith & Olga vs. Joe & Vicky
 Special musical guest: "Change Your Life"—Little Mix

Save Me skates
 Gareth & Robin: "Somebody to Love"—Queen
 Oona & Mark: "Just the Two of Us"—Bill Withers

Judges' votes to save
Barber: Gareth & Robin
Roberts: Oona & Mark
Gardiner: Gareth & Robin
Cousins: Gareth & Robin

Week 4 (27 January)
 Theme: School Disco – songs were chosen from each of the celebrities school days.
 Group performance: "Kidz"—Take That

Save Me skates
 Anthea & Andy: "Feeling Good"—Michael Bublé
 Keith & Olga: "Disturbia"—Rihanna

 Judges' votes to save
 Barber: Keith & Olga
 Roberts: Anthea & Andy
 Gardiner: Keith & Olga
 Cousins: Keith & Olga

Week 5 (3 February)
 Theme: The leveller – each celebrity had to perform a 30-second solo skate in their routine.
 Group performance: "Hot Right Now"—Rita Ora
 Torvill & Dean performance: "Better Together"—Jack Johnson

Save Me skates
 Shayne & Maria: "Sweet Disposition"—The Temper Trap
 Matt & Brianne: "Talking to the Moon"—Bruno Mars

Judges' votes to save
Barber: Matt & Brianne
Roberts: Matt & Brianne
Gardiner: Shayne & Maria
Cousins: Matt & Brianne

Week 6 (10 February)
 Theme: Love week
 Group performance: "Love Is in the Air"—John Paul Young

Save Me skates
 Joe & Vicky: "I Started a Joke"—Robin Gibb
 Keith & Olga: "One Day Like This"—Elbow

Judges' votes to save
Barber: Keith & Olga 
Roberts: Keith & Olga
Gardiner: Keith & Olga
Cousins: Keith & Olga

Week 7 (17 February)
 Theme: Team challenge – the winning team will get the scores from their individual skates doubled.
 Teams:
Team Matt – Matt, Luke & Gareth
Team Beth – Beth, Samia & Keith
 Group performances: "U Can't Touch This"—MC Hammer (Team Matt) and "Gangnam Style"—Psy (Team Beth)
 Special musical guest: Olly Murs—"Army of Two"

Judges' votes for Team challenge
Barber: Team Matt
Roberts: Team Matt
Gardiner: Team Beth
Cousins: Team Matt

Save Me skates
 Keith & Olga: "O Fortuna"—Carl Orff
 Samia & Sylvain: "Should I Stay or Should I Go"—The Clash

Judges' votes to save
Barber: Samia & Sylvain
Roberts: Samia & Sylvain
Gardiner: Keith & Olga
Cousins: Samia & Sylvain

Week 8 (24 February)
 Theme: Prop week
 Props:
 Beth – Hula hoop
 Luke – Skipping rope
 Matt – Three hats
 Samia – Hairdressing chair
 Gareth – Rugby ball
 Group performance: "Galvanize"—The Chemical Brothers
 Torvill & Dean performance: "Accentuate the Positive" (performed with Jools Holland's Rhythm and Blues Orchestra & Rumer)

Save Me skates
 Luke and Jenna: "Don't You Worry Child"—Swedish House Mafia
 Samia and Sylvain: "Bailamos"—Enrique Iglesias

Judges' votes to save
Barber: Luke & Jenna
Roberts: Luke & Jenna
Gardiner: Luke & Jenna
Cousins: Luke & Jenna

Week 9: Semi-final (3 March)
 Theme: Flying
 Group performance: "Titanium"—David Guetta ft. Sia
 Torvill & Dean performance: "Never Tear Us Apart"

Save Me skates
Matt and Brianne: "Iris"—Goo Goo Dolls
Beth and Dan: "Live and Let Die"—Paul McCartney
Luke and Jenna: "Hometown Glory"—Adele

Week 10: Final (10 March)
 Themes: Showcase, Favourite skate; Boléro
 Torvill & Dean performance: "Bolero"

Ratings
Official ratings are taken from BARB.

References

External links
 Official website

Series 08
2013 British television seasons